The Love of Sunya (also known as The Loves of Sunya) is an American silent drama film made in 1927. It was directed by Albert Parker, and was based on the play The Eyes of Youth by Max Marcin and Charles Guernon. Produced by and starring Gloria Swanson, it also stars John Boles and Pauline Garon. A copy of The Love of Sunya survives in the Paul Killiam collection.

Plot
The film depicts a young woman (Swanson) given by a mystic an occasional glimpse into her future, notably her future with different men.

Cast
Gloria Swanson as Sunya Ashling
John Boles as  Paul Judson
Pauline Garon as Anna Hagan
Ian Keith as Louis Anthony
Andres de Segurola as Paola deSalvo
Anders Randolf as Robert Goring
Hugh Miller as The Outcast
Robert Schable as Henri Picard
Ivan Lebedeff as Ted Morgan
John Miltern as Asa Ashling
Raymond Hackett as Kenneth Ashling
Florence Fair as Rita Ashling

Production background
The film was Swanson's first independent production; she later called it an "agonizing ordeal". She chose to film another adaptation of Max Marcin and Charles Guernon's play, for it had been filmed once before in 1919, starring Clara Kimball Young, and was a resounding success on Broadway. Swanson hired Albert Parker, who had directed the 1919 film, in the hope, given that Parker was already familiar with the material, that the production would be quicker.

Swanson ignored advice to shoot the film in Hollywood and opted to rent space in William Randolph Hearst's Cosmopolitan Studios in New York City. Production began in September 1926 but problems quickly arose due to Swanson's lack of experience as a producer. The production soon ran over budget and was marred by several other problems, mainly the lack of a suitable cameraman to deal with the film's intricate double exposures. According to Swanson's autobiography, the services of cinematographer George Barnes were eventually secured, though he is given no screen credit.

Reception
The Love of Sunya premiered at the grand opening of the Roxy Theatre in New York City on March 11, 1927. Swanson later wrote that the film received a standing ovation. Despite this initial good reception and decent reviews from critics, the film performed poorly at the box office, and barely recouped its budget. Swanson felt it was terrible. Owing to its failure, producer Joseph M. Schenck convinced Swanson to come back to Hollywood and to film something more commercial. Swanson agreed but ended up filming the more controversial Sadie Thompson (1928) instead, which became her most successful independent production.

References

External links
 
 
The Love of Sunya at SilentEra

1927 films
1927 drama films
Silent American drama films
American silent feature films
American black-and-white films
American films based on plays
Films directed by Albert Parker
Films shot in New York City
United Artists films
1920s American films